Orochelidon is a genus of birds in the swallow family Hirundinidae. These species are resident in the Andes Mountains of South America.

Taxonomy
The genus Orochelidon was introduced in 1903 by the America ornithologist Robert Ridgway with the brown-bellied swallow as the type species. The name combines the Ancient Greek oros meaning "mountain" and khelidōn meaning "swallow". The genus was formerly considered as a junior synonym of the genus Notiochelidon but was resurrected for a clade of Neotropical swallows based on a molecular phylogenetic study published in 2005.

Species
The genus contains three species:
Pale-footed swallow (Orochelidon flavipes)
Brown-bellied swallow (Orochelidon murina)
Andean swallow (Orochelidon andecola)

References

 
Bird genera
Hirundinidae
Taxonomy articles created by Polbot